Milton Barry "Milt" Sonsky (born July 2, 1941) is an American former javelin thrower who competed in the 1972 Summer Olympics.

External links 
 Milt Sonsky at trackfield.brinkster.net
 
 

1941 births
Living people
American male javelin throwers
Olympic track and field athletes of the United States
Athletes (track and field) at the 1972 Summer Olympics